Holladay-Harrington House is a historic estate located at Greenville, New Castle County, Delaware.  It was designed about 1927 by noted Delaware architect E. William Martin.  It is a -story, three bays wide, stuccoed dwelling in the Colonial Revival style.  The house has a hipped roof with wide overhanging eaves, projecting pavilion-like side sun porches, and French doors in all three first floor bays.  The property includes a contributing garage, three small greenhouses, driveway pillars, fountain and concrete pool, retaining wall, metal fencing with grape design near greenhouses, and landscape features.

It was listed on the National Register of Historic Places in 2004.

References

Houses on the National Register of Historic Places in Delaware
Colonial Revival architecture in Delaware
Houses completed in 1927
Houses in New Castle County, Delaware
National Register of Historic Places in New Castle County, Delaware